The Naucratis Painter was a Laconian vase painter of the mid-sixth century BC. Naucratis was a Greek trading post (emporion) in Egypt. Two fragments of a kylix found in the Demeter Sanctuary, Cyrene, show that the Naucratis Painter was literate, and the form of a three-stroke iota suggests, moreover, that he was a foreigner in Laconia.

See also
 Corpus vasorum antiquorum

Notes

Further reading 
Lane, E.A., 'Lakonian Vase Painting', Annual of the British School at Athens 34 (1933–34) 99–189.
Pipili, M., Laconian Iconography (1987).
Stibbe, C.M., Lakonische Vasenmaler des sechsten Jahrhunderts vor Christus (Amsterdam, 1972).
Stibbe, C.M., Laconian Drinking Vessels and Other Open Shapes (Amsterdam, 1994).

6th-century BC Greek people
Ancient Greek vase painters
Anonymous artists of antiquity
Ancient Laconia